The discography for Milestone Records runs from 1966 when the label was established by Orrin Keepnews and Dick Katz.

Discography

9000 series

2000 series
The Milestone 2000 Series reissued historical jazz and blues recordings including those of Jelly Roll Morton and King Oliver that were originally released in the 1920s on Gennett Records and Ma Rainey and Blind Lemon Jefferson that were originally released on Paramount Records.

References

External links
Discogs

Milestone Records albums
Discographies of American record labels